The Boston mayoral election of 1975 occurred on Tuesday, November 4, 1975, between Mayor Kevin White and state senator Joseph F. Timilty. White was elected to a third term.

The nonpartisan municipal preliminary election was held on September 23, 1975.

Candidates
Joseph F. Timilty, member of the Massachusetts Senate since 1972. Member of the Boston City Council from 1967 to 1971.
Kevin White, Mayor of Boston since 1968, Massachusetts Secretary of the Commonwealth from 1961 to 1967.

Candidates eliminated in preliminary
Robert Gibbons, member of the U.S. Labor Party.
Norman Oliver, member of the Socialist Workers Party.

Results

See also
List of mayors of Boston, Massachusetts

References

Mayor
Boston mayoral
Boston
Mayoral elections in Boston
Non-partisan elections